The American Association of State Colleges and Universities (AASCU) is an organization of state-supported colleges and universities that offer degree programs leading to bachelor's, master's or doctoral degrees. AASCU grew out of the Association of Teacher Education Institutions that had been organized in 1951 to serve public comprehensive institutions.  Most of the original member institutions began as single-purpose institutions, most commonly normal schools.

Purpose
The AASCU has a four-fold purpose:
To promote appreciation and support for public higher education and the distinctive contributions of our member colleges and universities; 
To analyze public policy, and to advocate for member institutions and the students they serve; 
To provide policy leadership and program support to strengthen academic quality, promote access and inclusion, and facilitate educational innovation; and
To create professional development opportunities for institutional leaders, especially presidents, chancellors and their spouses.

Membership

There are nearly 400 member institutions of AASCU.

References

External links
Official website

 
Organizations established in 1951
College and university associations and consortia in the United States
1951 establishments in the United States